The 2010 LifeLock.com 400 was a NASCAR Sprint Cup Series race that was held on July 10, 2010 at Chicagoland Speedway in Joliet, Illinois. It was the nineteenth race of the 2010 NASCAR Sprint Cup Series season. The event began at 7:30 p.m. Local Time on TNT. It was broadcast on the radio station Motor Racing Network at 6:30 p.m. EDT.

Contested over 267 laps, the race had a total of four cautions and ten lead changes among seven different drivers. David Reutimann clinched his first and only cup victory of the season (along with his second and final career NASCAR Cup Series win) driving for Michael Waltrip Racing after starting seventh. Carl Edwards finished second and Jeff Gordon finished third.

Race report

Background

Chicagoland Speedway is one of ten intermediate tracks to hold NASCAR races; the others are Atlanta Motor Speedway, Kansas Speedway, Charlotte Motor Speedway, Darlington Raceway, Homestead Miami Speedway, New Hampshire Motor Speedway, Kentucky Speedway, Las Vegas Motor Speedway, and Texas Motor Speedway. The track's turns are each banked at 18 degrees and have a turn width of 55 feet. The racetrack has a grandstand capacity of 75,000.

Prior to the race, Kevin Harvick of Richard Childress Racing led the Drivers' Championship with 2,684 points, 212 points ahead of Jeff Gordon in second. Behind them, Jimmie Johnson was third with 2,459 points, and Kurt Busch was fourth with 2,439 points, Denny Hamlin was fifth with 2,400 points. Kyle Busch, Matt Kenseth, Jeff Burton, Tony Stewart and Greg Biffle rounded out the top ten in the Championship. In the Manufacturers' Championship, Chevrolet was leading with 130 points, twenty points ahead of their rival Toyota. In the battle for third place, Dodge and Ford were tied with 78 points each.

Practice and qualifying

Two practice sessions were held before the Saturday race—both on Friday. The first session lasted 105 minutes, and the evening session completed after 45 minutes. In the first practice session, Joe Nemechek was the quickest, ahead of the Chevrolet of Casey Mears and the Ford of David Stremme in second and third. Jeff Gordon and Jimmie Johnson followed in fourth and fifth. In the second practice session, Juan Pablo Montoya was quickest, while Jamie McMurray and Greg Biffle followed in second and third. Johnson and Carl Edwards rounded out the top five.

During qualifying, forty-seven drivers were entered, but only the fastest forty-three raced because of NASCAR's qualifying procedure. McMurray clinched his sixth pole position, with a time of 29.421. He was joined on the front row of the grid by Johnson. Tony Stewart managed to qualify third, and Biffle qualified fourth. Sam Hornish Jr. qualified fifth and Gordon, David Reutimann, Paul Menard, Martin Truex Jr. and Montoya rounded off the top ten. The four drivers that failed to qualify for the race were J. J. Yeley, Dave Blaney, Michael McDowell, and Todd Bodine.

Race
The race, the nineteenth out of a total of thirty-six in the season, began at 7:30 p.m. EDT and was televised live in the United States on TNT. Conditions were sunny with a high , but there was a fifty percent chance of scattered thunderstorms in the area which could make the track potentially slippery later in the race. Co-director of Raceway Windy City Ministries Glenn Spoolstra began the pre-race ceremonies by giving the invocation. Afterward, Jim Cornelison, the Chicago Blackhawks national anthem singer, performed the United States National Anthem while Duncan Keith gave the command to start engines.

Jamie McMurray maintained the first position going through turns one and two, but Johnson, who had started second passed McMurray to lead the first lap. Two laps later, David Reutimann moved into sixth, after passing Sam Hornish Jr. After three laps, McMurray fell to fourth because of car handling problems. On lap 7, Tony Stewart passed Greg Biffle for the second position. Hornish Jr., who started fifth, had fallen seven positions to twelfth by lap 11. Carl Edwards, after starting eleventh, moved into eighth on lap 15. By lap 20, Johnson had a one-second lead over Stewart in second. Seven laps later, McMurray moved into third by passing Biffle.

On lap 39, the first caution was brought out because David Stremme collided with the wall. Afterward, teams made their first pit stop. Johnson remained the leader, as Martin Truex Jr. moved to second for the restart. One lap later, McMurray moved into the second position. On lap 48, Jeff Gordon moved into the seventh position, after passing Juan Pablo Montoya and A. J. Allmendinger. On lap 60, Johnson had led more laps at the beginning of this race than any other in the season. Eight laps later, Truex Jr. and his teammate Reutimann were in the third and fourth positions. On lap 70, Stewart moved into the eight position, as Biffle moved into the top-ten. After seventy-two laps, Kyle Busch, who began in the thirty-third position, had moved to twenty-fifth. On lap 80, Montoya moved into seventh, by passing Biffle. By lap 88, five cars had gone to the garage area of the track, they were Landon Cassill, Casey Mears, Mike Bliss, Max Papis and Joe Nemechek.

Two laps later, Johnson had a two-second lead over McMurray, as pit stops began. On lap 96, McMurray became the leader as Johnson came to pit road. After missing pit lane the first time, Johnson was scored in the third position two laps later. On lap 108, Johnson passed Truex Jr. for second, but he was still scored 1.1 seconds behind McMurray. Eight laps later, Reutimann passed Truex Jr. for the third position. Afterward on lap 120, Martin Truex Jr. continued to lose positions, as he fell to fourth after being passed by Jeff Gordon. Nine laps later, the second caution came out because of debris. The green flag waved for the restart on lap 136, with McMurray and Johnson in first and second. One lap later, Johnson got loose and spun sideways through the grass to bring out the third caution, but he retained no major damage. Johnson fell to the twenty-fourth position after having to make a pit stop under this caution.

On lap 140, McMurray restarted in the first position. Four laps later, Reutimann moved forward one position into third, after passing Truex Jr. Afterward, on lap 147, Truex Jr. lost two positions after being passed by Clint Bowyer and Jeff Burton. On lap 166, McMurray was passed by Gordon for the lead . Three laps later, Reutimann passed McMurray for the second position. On lap 174, Johnson came to pit lane after colliding with the wall. Four laps later, Stewart claimed the eighth position after passing Truex Jr. On lap 180, the fourth caution came out because Bill Elliott collided with the wall, as Robby Gordon careened into Elliott. Nine laps later, the green flag waved as Gordon led. On lap 192, Biffle began losing positions because of an engine failure.

Two laps later, Kevin Harvick drove his race car to the garage area. On lap 197, it was said that Harvick's crew members were changing a fuel pump. On lap 212, Edwards passed McMurray for fourth. One lap later, Reutimann passed Gordon for the lead. Fifteen laps later, Biffle's engine failed. One lap later, Johnson made a scheduled green flag pit stop. On lap 233 Bowyer claimed the lead as Reutimann came to pit lane for a stop. Afterward, Edwards and Montoya led as green flag pit stops continued. Green flag pit stops finished on lap 236, after Reutimann reclaimed the lead. On lap 242 Edwards claimed the second position from Gordon. Reutimann remained the leader, and crossed the finish line first to clinch his second career victory in the Sprint Cup Series. Edwards finished second ahead of Gordon, Bowyer and McMurray.

Classification

Qualifying

Race results

Standings after the race

Drivers' Championship standings

 Note: Only the top twelve positions are included for the driver standings.

References

LifeLock.com 400
NASCAR races at Chicagoland Speedway
2010 in sports in Illinois
July 2010 sports events in the United States